The Cleveland Guardians are currently heard on the radio via flagship stations WTAM (/) and WMMS (100.7 FM), with Tom Hamilton and Jim Rosenhaus comprising the announcing team. Televised game coverage airs on Bally Sports Great Lakes, with select games simulcast over-the-air on WKYC (channel 3). Matt Underwood handles television play-by-play duties, with former Indian Rick Manning as analyst and Andre Knott as field reporter.

Years are listed in descending order.

Notes 
Gold shading indicates championship season.

References

 
Cleveland Indians
Broadcasters
SportsChannel
Fox Sports Networks
Bally Sports